Warts and All: Volume 4 is a live album recorded on July 18, 1998, at the Copper Dragon in Carbondale, Illinois.  It is the fourth set in a collection of commercially released full-concert live albums by the American jam band moe.

This set features the first released versions of "Backwoods" and "Bearsong".

Track listing

Disc one
All tracks recorded live on July 18, 1998, at the Copper Dragon in Carbondale, Illinois, with the exception of "Brent Black".

"tuning" — 1:23
"Threw It All Away" (Schnier) — 4:56
"St. Augustine" (Derhak) — 11:07
"Waiting for the Punchline" (Schnier) — 13:39
"Happy Hour Hero" (Derhak) — 11:25
"Backwoods" — 4:40
"Y.O.Y." -> (Garvey) — 12:22
"Recreational Chemistry" (Schnier) — 16:52

Disc two
 "The Harder They Come" (Cliff) — 7:30
 "tuning" — 0:40
 "Dr. Graffenburg" -> (Derhak) — 22:37
 "Havah Negliah" -> (traditional) — 5:07
 "Time Ed" (Derhak) — 16:08
 "Water" (Derhak) — 7:30
 "Brent Black -> Low Rider -> Brent Black"* — 15:16

"Brent Black" recorded 11/15/1997 in Knoxville, TN.

Disc three
 "Yodelittle" -> (Schnier) — 22:58
 "Rebubula" -> (Derhak) — 28:51
 "I Know You Rider" (traditional) — 12:36
 "banter" — 1:26
 "Bearsong" (Schnier) — 9:04

Personnel

moe.
Vinnie Amico – drums
Rob Derhak – bass, vocals
Chuck Garvey – guitar, vocals, illustrations
Al Schnier – guitar, vocals

Additional personnel
Steve Young – mixing
Fred Kevorkian – mastering
Becca Childs Derhak – art direction, photography

References

External links 
Warts and All: Volume 4 download @ Disc Logic

Moe (band) live albums
2005 live albums